Balázs Bérczy (born 15 January 1966 in Pécs) is a former Hungarian football player who currently is the managing director of Pécsi Mecsek FC.

References
 Futballévkönyv 1999 [Football Yearbook 1999], Volume I, pp. 78–82., Aréna 2000 kiadó, Budapest, 2000 
 Ki kicsoda a magyar sportéletben? [Who's Who in the Hungarian Sports Life], Volume I (A–H). Szekszárd, Babits Kiadó, 1994, pp. 128, 

1966 births
Living people
Sportspeople from Pécs
Hungarian footballers
Hungarian expatriate footballers
Hungary international footballers
Association football midfielders
Pécsi MFC players
Expatriate footballers in Belgium
Beerschot A.C. players
Hungarian expatriate sportspeople in Belgium
Volán FC players
Budapest Honvéd FC players
Újpest FC players
Budapesti VSC footballers
BKV Előre SC footballers